"'Warts and All'" is the second episode of the second season and the fifteenth overall, of the horror black comedy series Scream Queens. It was directed by Bradley Buecker and written by series co-creator Brad Falchuk. It premiered on September 27, 2016 on Fox Broadcasting Company. The episode centers on Chad's attempt to win Chanel back and facing competition from Dr. Brock. Meanwhile, Chanel #5 finds love with a patient with severe warts around his body. The episode was watched by 1.70 million viewers and received positive reviews from critics.

Plot
Chanel #5 (Abigail Breslin) is being interrogated by a detective regarding Catherine Hobart's decapitation. She is desperate because nobody believes her, especially Chanel (Emma Roberts) and Chanel #3 (Billie Lourd). Meanwhile, a new patient with a Neurofibromatosis type I, Tyler (Colton Haynes), is being admitted into the hospital, where Dr. Brock (John Stamos) admits that they have a problem: there is a device that could help remove his warts, but it is expensive and the hospital does not have it yet, which makes Tyler desperate. Zayday (Keke Palmer) grows suspicious that Dean Cathy Musnch (Jamie Lee Curtis) hired the Chanels to get rid of them one by one, so she enlists Chamberlain (James Earl) to investigate why Cathy built a hospital in the first place. Later, Chanel and Dr. Brock go on a movie date, where all of a sudden his hand uncontrollably grabs Chanel's breast and grips another man's popcorn. Unaffected, Chanel is smitten and they proceed to kiss.

Chanel is on a night shift where she is chased by the Red Devil. It turns out to be Chad Radwell (Glen Powell) in disguise and it is revealed that it was he who scared Chanel in the asylum at the end of the first season. He is there to accompany his friend Randall, who has a severe trauma-caused screaming problem, while also planning to win her back. But he soon learna that Chanel is less than impressed with Chad's new antics as she is really bewitched by Dr. Brock's charm. Chad challenges Dr. Brock to a squash game to fight over Chanel. He is easily beaten by Brock, but after noticing how his right hand is behaving strangely, he confronts Brock who warns him to back off. Chad hires a private investigator and he discovers that Brock's right hand was from a squash player who happened to be a serial killer. He goes to confront him.

Zayday and Chamberlain continue their investigation and find out that in 1986, the entire staff of the old hospital (including Dr. Mike (Jerry O'Connell) and Nurse Thomas (Laura Bell Bundy) were murdered during a halloween party by someone in the Green Meanie costume, and they never found out the killer's identity. In the hallway, they bump into Nurse Ingrid Hoffel (Kirstie Alley) who asks Zayday about the Chanels' schedule to keep track with them secretively. An unconvinced Zayday is even more repulsed by Ingrid's obvious lies. Ingrid angrily tells her off. Later Zayday confronts Musnch about her plans, but Musnch reveals her true intentions of opening the hospital; she is trying to find a cure for herself as she has in incurable disease that is terminal, and she bursts into tears. Zayday tries to find a cure for her, but after some trials deduce that there is no cure and she only has a year to live. Cathy tells her this must be kept a secret, but unknown to them Ingrid is secretly listening to their conversation.

One night, Cathy gets ambushed by the Green Meanie in the hospital hallways and is able to defeat it. Just when she is about to unmask the killer, Dr. Cassidy Cascade (Taylor Lautner) and Chanel #3 arrive and distract Cathy. She is furious because the killer escaped due to their sudden arrival. Realizing Chanel #5's claims are true, she enlists CIA agent Denise Hemphill (Niecy Nash) to help them investigate, and she suggests they speak to Hester Ulrich (Lea Michelle) as she was a killer too. Hester demands to be transferred from the highly secure prison to the C.U.R.E. institute and given some discontinued beauty products and threatens more killings will occur if they refuse.

Tyler and Chanel #5 get closer as he comforts her, where she tells him she is depressed because of the Chanels' treatment to her and how she is not capable of getting a boyfriend. As a sympathetic Tyler reveals his photo before he was plagued by warts, Chanel #5 is stunned to see how handsome he was and decide to raise funds for his surgery. Chanel and Chanel #3 mock #5's fund raising video and tell her that as soon as Tyler is healed, he will feel the need to date her out of pity, while #5 is unsure. While at dinner together, Chanel #5 admits that she likes Tyler's personality despite his warts. She suddenly goes into a rampage when two guys insults Tyler. After calming down, she apologizes to him for being uncontrollable but Tyler is impressed. As they grow closer, Chanel seemingly congratulates #5 for being able to look into someone's soul rather than their ugly appearance (she was actually congratulating Tyler, instead) and announces she manipulated Chad to donate money for Tyler's surgery. The new couple are facetiming before his supposed surgery, but after it ends, #5 discover that his surgery is not scheduled that day and tells the Chanels about it. In the surgery room, Tyler is shocked to see the Green Meanie instead of the surgeons and the Green Meanie burns him with the laser that would be used for his surgery. The Chanels arrive too late; he is dead. As Chanel #5 mourns his death, Chanel states that they have another serial killer in their hands.

Reception

Ratings
"Warts and All" was watched by 1.70 million viewers, and received a 0.7/3 rating in the 18-49 demographic. This was down significantly from the previous episode, "Scream Again."

Viewers who were afflicted with NF realized the many flaws in this piece—They believed that neurofibromatosis was misrepresented, with the tumors it causes referred to as "warts" and the name "Neurofibromatosis" pronounced incorrectly by the actor who played Tyler.  The Children's Tumor Foundation made an official statement asking the cast and crew of Scream Queens to educate themselves on NF. Scream Queens did not respond.

Critical reception
Joel Leaver from SpoilerTV gave the episode a positive review, citing "This episode gave me the laughs, chills and hotness that last week perhaps could've given me more of. Hopefully it'll only get better," while also praising Glen Powell's return. Blaise Hopkins from TVOvermind wrote "Ultimately, Scream Queens provides a great balance from week to week, giving viewers the humor and lightheartedness they want while also providing a compelling mystery to complement everything else."

References 

2016 American television episodes
Scream Queens (2015 TV series) episodes
Television episodes written by Brad Falchuk